Drunkenness of Noah is a painting by the Italian artist Giovanni Bellini. It was finished about 1515. It is kept in the Museum of Fine Arts and Archeology of Besançon, France.

Composition
Noah is sleeping naked. The Cup and the bunches of grapes (on the foreground), and the vineyard (in the back) suggests that Noah is drunk. These three sons are represented at his side. Shem and Japhet (left and right) avert their eyes and cover their father with a red cloth. But Ham, the third son, laughs when he see his father.

Origins
The work refers to Genesis 9:20–23

References

External links 
 https://web.archive.org/web/20070612155806/http://www.musee-arts-besancon.org/

1515 paintings
Paintings by Giovanni Bellini
Paintings depicting Noah
Collections of the Musée des Beaux-Arts et d'archéologie de Besançon
Food and drink paintings